East Hills Girls Technology High School is a public comprehensive secondary school for girls in Panania, a suburb in south west Sydney. Grounds include our Sports Centre, Gym, basketball courts, eating areas and canteen facilities.

East Hills Girls Technology High School is an Apple Distinguished School. As a school community, we value the power of technology to equip students with the knowledge and skills to succeed across different educational settings and the world beyond school. 

Apple Distinguished Schools are centres of innovation, leadership, and educational excellence. They use Apple technology to connect students to the world, fuel creativity, deepen collaboration, and made learning personal.

For more information, read the Apple Distinguished Application

View the Facebook page of East Hills Girls Technology High School here.

References

Girls' schools in New South Wales
Public high schools in Sydney
Educational institutions established in 1953
1953 establishments in Australia